Leonforte (Liunforti in sicilian) is an Italian comune with a population of 14,046 in the Province of Enna, Sicily. The town is situated 22 km from Enna, in the centre of the Erean Mountains at 600 metres a.s.l.

History 
The ancient settlement of Tabas or Tavaca stood in the approximate location of Leonforte. During the Byzantine period of Sicily, and later under the Muslim Emirate of Sicily, a castle was built with a farmhouse in its vicinity. Irrigation systems were introduced and many mills took advantage of the abundance of water. In 1610 Nicolò Placido Branciforti founded a city, naming it Leonforte in tribute to his family's coat of arms; a lion holding a banner with the motto in fortitudine bracchii tui.

Main sights
Chiesa Madre (mother church)
Capuchin church and convent (mausoleum that houses the sarcophagus of Princess Caterina Branciforte, who died in 1634, and  a painting by Pietro Novelli, depicting The Election of Matthias to the Apostolate
Church of Madonna del CarmeloGranfonte (Fountain)
Palazzo Branciforti
Castello di Tavi

 Economy 
The economy is largely based on agriculture. In the past century Leonforte has always had an agricultural economy with many labourers. This has made the town a stronghold for the political left. There are a few industries located within an industrial zone. Another important activity is construction work. Leonforte has one of the highest unemployment rates of the province, at 22%. Leonforte is adjacent to the road Strada Statale 121 that  connects Enna, Palermo, Nissoria, and Paternò. The train station is located 10 km from the centre of Leonforte.

 References

 Sources
 Giovanni Mazzola, Notizie Storiche sulla vetusta Tavaca e sulla Moderna Leonforte, Tipografia Editrice del Lavoro, 1924
 Domenico Ligresti, Leonforte: un paese nuovo,'' in «Archivio Storico per la Sicilia Orientale» a. LXXIV, 1978, I pp. 89–118

Municipalities of the Province of Enna